Erythroxylum macrophyllum is a tropical tree in the family Erythroxylaceae.  It is found in Costa Rica.  It grows at altitudes of 1200–1400 m.  It is a small tree of the understory reaching 2 to 6 meters.  The leaves are alternate and are aligned in a plane.  Small white flowers are borne March through June; they are followed by fruit that persist until September and are red when ripe.

References

Trees of Costa Rica
macrophyllum
Taxa named by Antonio José Cavanilles